Collins Street or Collins St. may refer to:

Structures

Places of worship
 Collins Street Baptist Church, a church in Melbourne, Australia
 Collins Street Independent Church, a church in Melbourne, Australia

Skyscrapers
 101 Collins Street, a skyscraper in Melbourne, Australia
 120 Collins Street, a skyscraper in Melbourne, Australia
 555 Collins Street, a proposed skyscraper in Melbourne, Australia
 568 Collins Street, a skyscraper in Melbourne, Australia

Thoroughfares
 Collins Street, Hobart, a street in Hobart, Australia
 Collins Street, Melbourne, a street in Melbourne, Australia
 Little Collins Street, a street in Melbourne, Australia

Other
 Collins St., 5 pm, a painting by John Brack